Phaeolepiota is a genus of fungi in the family Squamanitaceae. The genus is monotypic, containing the single species Phaeolepiota aurea. Commonly known as golden bootleg or golden cap, P. aurea is an agaric (gilled mushroom) found throughout North America and Eurasia – often in groups and next to nettles. Molecular research, based on cladistic analysis of DNA sequences, shows that Phaeolepiota is close to and may be congeneric with Cystoderma.

Description
The mushroom is large and golden, and its stem has a skirt-like ring. The spores are brown.

Economic Usage
Fruit bodies of Phaeolepiota aurea have been considered edible and are collected for food in Russia and China. It is not, however, recommended for consumption since it can cause gastrointestinal upset. Studies have shown that fruit bodies contain unacceptable amounts of both cadmium and cyanide compounds. Cooking reduces the concentration of the cyanide compounds present, which may be the reason why Phaeolepiota aurea has been considered edible.

References

External links
 

Monotypic Basidiomycota genera
Fungi of North America
Fungi of Europe
Fungi of Asia